Hamilton United is a Canadian semi-professional soccer club based in Hamilton, Ontario that plays in the League1 Ontario men's and women's divisions.

History
The club was founded in 2013 by local clubs Saltfleet-Stoney Creek SC, Mount Hamilton Youth SC, and Ancaster SC to foster youth development.

The club's first team entered the League1 Ontario women's division in 2018. They played their inaugural match against West Ottawa SC on April 28.

In 2020, they added a team in the men's division, although their debut has been delayed indefinitely due to the COVID-19 pandemic. As preparation for the top division, they fielded a team in the L1O men's Reserve division in 2019. After once again fielding only a team in the reserve division in 2021 due to the pandemic, Hamilton's men's team finally made their debut in the main division in 2022, on April 26, defeating Burlington SC 2-0.

Seasons 
Men

Women

Notable former players
 Obrad Bejatović

References

2013 establishments in Ontario
League1 Ontario teams
Soccer clubs in Hamilton, Ontario